Vera Kistiakowsky (9 September 1928 – 11 December 2021) was an American research physicist, teacher, and arms control activist. She was professor emerita at Massachusetts Institute of Technology in the physics department and Laboratory for Nuclear Science, and was an activist for women's participation in the sciences. Kistiakowsky was an expert in experimental particle physics and observational astrophysics. She was the first woman appointed MIT professor of physics.

Education and family
Kistiakowsky was born in Princeton, New Jersey in 1928. She was the daughter of physical chemist George Kistiakowsky, who taught at Harvard and served as President Dwight D. Eisenhower's science adviser. Her mother, Hildegard Moebius, was the daughter of a Lutheran pastor and she went to school in Berlin to get her M.D. However, she never got her M.D, and instead worked as a technician and supported medical units on the front lines of World War I. Kistiakowsky's early education in the sciences was greatly influenced by her father. He made special arrangements so that she could spend summers in Los Alamos with him where he was working on the Manhattan Project. During this time she was also attending Mount Holyoke College where "she excelled in chemistry and math, just like her father. 'I thought very highly of my father,' says Vera. 'He told me very seriously that I should find something to do that would support me and not rely on getting married and finding someone who would support me.'"

She earned her A.B. in chemistry from Mount Holyoke College in 1948 and a Ph.D. in chemistry from the University of California at Berkeley in 1952. She married Gerhard Fischer, a fellow student at the University of California in Berkeley, in 1951, and had two children.

Career
Kistiakowsky's professional career began in the nuclear chemistry field, later moving to nuclear physics, and then particle physics, and finally astrophysics. She held a postdoctoral fellowship working in experimental nuclear physics with Luis Walter Alvarez. She worked at Columbia University from 1954–1959, first as a research fellow in chemistry, assisting a nuclear chemist; she then found support to become a research associate in the physics department assisting Chien-Shiung Wu. Kistiakowsky and her family moved to Cambridge, Massachusetts when her husband got a job at Cambridge Electronic Accelerator. She then worked at Brandeis University for a short time as an assistant professor before starting work at MIT in 1963. At MIT she began her career as a staff member of the MIT Laboratory for Nuclear Science where she worked from 1963 to 1969. She was Senior Research Scientist in the MIT Department of Physics from 1969 to 1971.

In 1972 she was the first woman appointed MIT professor of physics.

Committee and organization work
In 1969 she co-founded the Boston area group Women in Science and Engineering (WISE), a precursor to the Boston chapter of the Association for Women in Science (AWIS). Kistiakowsky served as chair or member on numerous MIT committees and groups relating to women at MIT and affirmative action at MIT, including the Women's Forum, and the Ad Hoc Committee on the Role of Women at MIT. In 1971 she founded the American Physical Society (APS) Committee on the Status of Women in Physics, securing a US$10,000 Sloan Foundation grant to produce a questionnaire on women's conditions of employment. The committee also created a roster of female physicists, "to counter claims that there were no qualified ones to hire". The committee's two and a half inch report convinced the APS to establish the Committee on the Status of Women in Physics in 1972, a committee still working today.

Other committees that she has been involved in include the National Research Council Conference on Women in Science and Engineering, and the Association for Women in Science, Women in Science and Engineering.

Kistiakowsky died on December 11, 2021.

References

Selected publications
An Outlook Book about Atomic Energy, Publication: Oliver and Boyd, 1963
One Way is Down: A Book about Gravity, Publication: Little, Brown, 1967

Further reading

External links
2014 Video Interview with Vera Kistiakowsky by Cynthia C. Kelly Voices of the Manhattan Project

1928 births
2021 deaths
21st-century American physicists
Arms control people
Massachusetts Institute of Technology School of Science faculty
People from Princeton, New Jersey
American women physicists
Mount Holyoke College alumni
American women academics
American people of Ukrainian descent
21st-century American women scientists